Closet Space is a 2008 horror film directed by Mel House. It stars Melanie Donihoo, Jovan Jackson, James LaMarr, Morgan McCarthy and Tim Wrobel. It was filmed in and around Houston, Texas.

Plot
Inspired by the writings of H. P. Lovecraft, the film follows a group of university students who are seeking their lost professor. They soon learn that he has discovered an alternate universe, accessible through a closet in an old farmhouse, and they decide to rescue him. Little do they know, horrible creatures live in the darkness of his alternate reality - ready to consume anything that enters their world.

Cast

Reception 
Geek of Doom was mixed in their review. Dread Central rated Closet Space at 3 1/2, writing that the film "has issues that almost all first-time low budget features do, but the subject matter, intellect of the characters and solid pacing place it a step above the rest of the indie schlock that’s out there."

References

External links 
  as archived December 29, 2010
 

2008 films
2008 horror films
American horror films
Direct-to-video horror films
Films set in Houston
Films shot in Houston
2000s English-language films
2000s American films